Waldsteinia ternata, commonly referred to as barren strawberry, is an herbaceous perennial plant. It has a disjunct distribution, being native to Eastern Europe and Eastern Asia, namely the Changbai Mountains of China, Sakhalin and Siberia in Russia, and Japan.

Both the leaves and the flowers of W. ternara are reminiscent of strawberry. The leaves are trifoliate (hence the specific epithet), arranged in rosettes, glossy, and evergreen in climates with mild winters. The yellow, five-petaled flowers appear in late spring or early summer. The fruit is an inedible berry. The spread is slow and thus not seen as aggressive. 

W. ternata has been cultivated since at least 1803. The cultivated plants are, for the most part, based on W. ternata subsp. trifolia. Undemanding of soil conditions, W. ternata is used in landscape and garden design as a groundcover or as an edger for the herbaceous border. As it can grow in either sun or dappled shade, it is considered appropriate for shade gardens. Neither pests nor diseases pose significant problems. The 'Kronstadt' cultivar has enlarged flowers, while 'Variegata' has variegated leaves.

References

Colurieae
Groundcovers